Jim Arnold may refer to:

Jim Arnold (American football) (born 1961), American football player
Jim Arnold (footballer) (born 1950), English soccer player
Jim Arnold (politician) (born 1950), American politician in Indiana
James R. Arnold (1923–2012), planetary scientist and chemist

See also
James Arnold (disambiguation)